Taft School or Taft High School may refer to:

 Taft School in Watertown, Connecticut, founded by Horace Dutton Taft, William Howard Taft's brother 

Schools named after William Howard Taft:
 William Howard Taft High School (Los Angeles)
 William Howard Taft High School (Chicago)
 William Howard Taft High School (New York City)
 William Howard Taft High School (San Antonio)

Other schools:
 Taft Union High School Taft, California
 Robert A. Taft Information Technology High School, also known as Taft High School, Cincinnati, Ohio, named for Robert A. Taft
 Taft High School (Lincoln City, Oregon), named for the former community of Taft, Oregon, which was named for William Howard Taft
 Taft High School (Texas), named after the community of Taft, Texas, which was named after Charles Taft